Physcaeneura is a butterfly genus from the subfamily Satyrinae in the family Nymphalidae.

Species
Physcaeneura jacksoni Carcasson, 1961
Physcaeneura leda (Gerstaecker, 1871)
Physcaeneura panda (Boisduval, 1847)
Physcaeneura pione Godman, 1880
Physcaeneura robertsi Kielland, 1990

External links 
 "Physcaeneura Wallengren, 1857" at Markku Savela's Lepidoptera and Some Other Life Forms

Satyrini
Butterfly genera
Taxa named by Hans Daniel Johan Wallengren